Cooks Point is an unincorporated community in Burleson County, Texas, United States. According to the Handbook of Texas, the community had a population of 60 in 2000. It is located within the Bryan-College Station metropolitan area.

History 
Cooks Point is one of the oldest communities in Burleson County. It was named for Silas L. Cooke, who lived in the area when the state was known as the Republic of Texas. The community started at the crossroads of the old colonial road from Washington on the Brazos and Independence to Fort Tenoxtitlan and Nashville, crossing the Old San Antonio Road. Gabriel Jackson built the first trading post here. He also built a log house that was two stories high and operated a store on its first floor. The first settlers to Cooks Point were Anglo, while Native Americans followed suit. A.S. Broaddus led a wagon train of 80 White and 120 Black settlers from Virginia to the community in 1854. German and Czech immigrants settled after the American Civil War, causing the population to grow to 100 by 1884. A Methodist church was the first church established here. Other churches came after, such as a Baptist church by Broaddus and his party in 1881, a German Methodist church, and a Czech Brethren church. By 1990, only the Cooks Point United Methodist Church and the Brethren church remained. Cooks Point had a general store and a gin for some time. A post office was established at Cooks Point in 1874 and remained in operation until 1913. That year, the Houston and Texas Central Railway built a track through the community. The general store was moved southward towards the road when Texas State Highway 21 was built through the area. It continued to operate until 1990. It had 60 residents at that time and remained at that level through 2000. It then became a farming settlement producing cotton, dairy, grain, and hay farms. There have also been several oil wells drilled around the area, lying among the Austin Chalk Formation.

Geography

Education 
Cooks Point had its own school around 1880 and was served by the Cooks Point independent school District until it joined the Caldwell independent school District in 1973. The community continues to be served by Caldwell ISD to this day.

References

Czech-American culture in Texas
Unincorporated communities in Burleson County, Texas
Unincorporated communities in Texas
Bryan–College Station